is the sixth Japanese single by South Korean boy group Shinee. It was released on December 12, 2012.

Background and release
The ballad "1000nen, Zutto Soba ni Ite..." was released on December 12, 2012. The B-side track, "Kimi ga Iru Sekai", is another ballad, with piano and percussion. The single comes with a bonus DVD, a 28-page book with photos and lyrics, and a trading card. The music video was released on November 26, 2012.

Track listing

Chart performance

Oricon chart

Other charts

Release history

References

2012 singles
Shinee songs
SM Entertainment singles
Japanese-language songs
2012 songs